A testimonial party is a political party that focuses on its principles, instead of adapting them to local or temporal issues in the pursuit of coalition government participation.

In the Netherlands
It is a peculiar phenomenon in the Netherlands, because of the Dutch system of proportional representation, in which any party that has over 0.66% of the vote can enter the House of Representatives. A typical House of Representatives has 10 or more factions represented. With such a large number of parties, it is all but impossible for one party to win the 76 seats needed for a majority in its own right. 

As a result, most Dutch political parties will negotiate and compromise to form a coalition government. Testimonial parties will not compromise; this, combined with the fact that they are usually small parties, makes their participation in a coalition government extremely unlikely. Examples of parties that have referred to themselves as "testimonial" include the orthodox Protestant Reformed Political Party (SGP) and the animal rights-advocating Party for the Animals. In contrast, the term 'program party' is used for parties oriented toward participation in coalitions.

In other countries
The Christian Heritage Party of New Zealand and the Christian Heritage Party of Canada, many members of which had Dutch ancestry, may have been a version of a 'testimonial party' effectively exported to a foreign context.

Many Trotskyist parties, such as the Workers' Party of Uruguay, usually obtain less than 1000 votes in every election.

See also
 Protest party
 Single-issue politics
 Beginselpartij
Abstentionism

References

Political terminology
Proportional representation electoral systems